St. John Arena is a  multi-purpose arena on the campus of Ohio State University in Columbus, Ohio, United States. The arena was named for Lynn St. John, who served as Ohio State's men's basketball coach and athletic director until 1947. It was designed by Howard Dwight Smith, architect of Ohio Stadium.  It opened in 1956 to serve as the home of multiple Buckeye athletic teams, primarily the men's basketball team. Prior to its construction, the men's basketball team played off-campus in the Fairgrounds Coliseum at the state fairgrounds. St. John Arena served as home of the men's and women's basketball teams until it was replaced by Value City Arena in 1998, while the remaining tenants moved to the Covelli Center in 2019. It is still occasionally used by the men's and women's basketball teams for games and is used before every OSU football home game for The Ohio State University Marching Band's Skull Session.

History
Located on north campus between Woody Hayes Drive and Lane Avenue, the 13,276-seat arena was built in 1956. During the time it was the home court of the Ohio State Buckeyes men's basketball team, it saw the Buckeyes win the 1960 National Championship and five straight Big Ten titles from 1960 to 1964 under coach Fred Taylor. The men's and women's basketball teams moved to their current home, Value City Arena at the Jerome Schottenstein Center, in 1998. The arena housed the school's men's and women's volleyball teams, men's and women's gymnastics teams, and wrestling squad until 2018. It also hosted the annual Buckeye Classic women's basketball tournament.

Concerts by popular musical artists were held at the arena from 1971 to 1980.

In 2004, St. John Arena hosted its first men's basketball game in six years because of a scheduling conflict at the Schottenstein Center. St. John Arena was again used for men's basketball on March 24, 2008, when the Buckeyes hosted an NIT game against the California Golden Bears. The Buckeyes eventually took the 2008 NIT title.

The most popular event still held at the arena is the Skull Session, the pep rally before football games. Two hours prior to kickoff The Ohio State University Marching Band performs Buckeye favorites, and the players and coaches speak to the crowd. With roots back to 1932, the Skull Session sometimes features the visiting team's marching band or local high school bands as well. Many fans arrive hours early to obtain seating for this Ohio State tradition.

St. John Arena is used for Freshmen Convocation, at which the entire freshman class meets for the first time and university leaders initiate the freshmen.

Possible demolition
Plans to demolish St. John were announced in November 2012, with the arena being replaced by Covelli Center, however in 2016, the university's associate vice president for planning and real estate said that the arena is unlikely to be demolished in the foreseeable future.

References

External links

 St. John Arena at Ohiostatebuckeyes.com

Basketball venues in Columbus, Ohio
College gymnastics venues in the United States
College volleyball venues in the United States
College wrestling venues in the United States
Defunct college basketball venues in the United States
Handball venues in the United States
Indoor arenas in Columbus, Ohio
Ohio State Buckeyes basketball venues
Ohio State Buckeyes men's gymnastics venues
Ohio State Buckeyes women's gymnastics venues
Ohio State Buckeyes men's volleyball venues
Ohio State Buckeyes women's volleyball venues
Ohio State Buckeyes wrestling venues
Sports venues in Columbus, Ohio
Wrestling venues in Ohio
University District (Columbus, Ohio)